Yiftach Fehige (born 1976) is a German philosopher and  Professor of Philosophy for Christianity and Science at the University of Toronto.
He is known for his works on thought experiments and philosophy of sexuality.

Life
Fehige studied theology, philosophy and physics in Frankfurt am Main and Munich. In 2001 he received the German Study Prize. From 2002 to 2006 he was a guest student at Tel Aviv University. In 2004 he received his doctorate at the University of Mainz with a dissertation on logic and philosophy of science. In 2006 he received a doctorate in theology too.

From 2004 to 2006, Fehige lectured on issues at the interface between philosophy and theology at the universities of Koblenz, Mainz and Frankfurt am Main. At the same time he worked as a teacher for Catholicism, Latin and philosophy at the St. Franziskus Gymnasium]] and Realschule in Kaiserslautern. In 2006 he did research with James Robert Brown on thought experiments at the Department of Philosophy at the University of Toronto (Canada). Since 2007 he has been a professor of Christianity and Science at the University of St. Michael's College and the department of History and Philosophy of Science at the University of Toronto.

Select publications
 Science and Religion: East and West (ed.), Routledge 2016
 Handbook of Thought Experiments (ed. With M. Stuart and J. R. Brown), Routledge 2018
 Die Geschlechterosion des semantischen Realismus. Eine logisch-semantische Untersuchung zum Begriff des biologischen Geschlechts. Paderborn: Mentis-Verlag 2006.
 Sexualphilosophie. Eine einführende Annäherung, Berlin 2007.
 Das Offenbarungsparadox. Auf dem Weg zu einem christlich-jüdischen Dialog, Paderborn 2012
 Über Gedankenexperimente, die Freiheit, das Mitgefühl und die Liebe. Auf der Suche nach der menschlichen Rationalität. in: Philosophischer Literaturanzeiger, Band 59 (2/2006)
 Kreativität im Denken: eine Kritik des Reliabilitätsarguments von John D. Norton gegen rationalistische Epistemologien zur Methode des Gedankenexperiments. In: Kreativität: Sektionsbeiträge zum XX. Deutschen Kongress für Philosophie in Berlin 2005; Band 1 / hrsg. von Günter Abel. Berlin : Univ.-Verl. der TU Berlin, 2005. ISBN 3-7983-1989-8.
 Die Frage nach Gott und eine Kritik der überzogenen Antwort von Norbert Hoerster. in: Zeitschrift Theologie und Philosophie der philosophisch-theologischen Hochschule St. Georgen in Frankfurt am Main. Jahrgang 81 (2006), Heft 1
 Wie wirklich ist der Gott der Theologen?  Eine Entgegnung auf den theologischen Agnostizismus von Peter Byrne. in: Zeitschrift Theologie und Philosophie der philosophisch-theologischen Hochschule St. Georgen in Frankfurt am Main. Jahrgang 79 (2004), Heft 4
 „Gotteserfahrung im Denken“. Zur Methode des Gedankenexperiments – eine Renaissance des Rationalismus? In: Ollig, Hans-Ludwig (Hg.): Theo-Anthropologie. Jörg Splett zu Ehren, Würzburg: echter-Verlag, 2006

References

External links
 Yiftach Fehige

Living people
1976 births
21st-century German philosophers
Philosophy academics
Philosophy writers
Philosophers of sexuality
Ethicists
Philosophers of science
German theologians
Academic staff of the University of Toronto
Johannes Gutenberg University Mainz alumni